The S. R. Kanthi cabinet was the Council of Ministers in Mysore State, a state in South India headed by S. R. Kanthi that was formed after the 1962 Mysore Legislative Assembly elections.

Chief Minister & Cabinet Ministers

Minister of State (Deputy Minister)

See also
 Mysore Legislative Assembly
 Mysore Legislative Council
 Politics of Mysore

References

External links
Council of Ministers

Cabinets established in 1962
1962 establishments in Mysore State
Kanthi
Indian National Congress state ministries
Cabinets disestablished in 1962
1962 disestablishments in India
1962 in Indian politics